Sète, also historically spelt Cette (official until 1928) and Sette, is a commune in the Hérault department, in the region of Occitania, southern France. Its inhabitants are called Sétois (male) and Sétoises (female) in French, "Setòris" and "Setòria" in Occitan.

Known as the Venice of Languedoc and the singular island (in Paul Valéry's words), it is a port and a seaside resort on the Mediterranean with its own very strong cultural identity, traditions, cuisine and dialect. It is the hometown of such artists as Paul Valéry, Jean Vilar, Georges Brassens, Hervé Di Rosa, Manitas de Plata, and Robert Combas.  Since 2001, François Commeinhes is the mayor of the city.

Geography

Built upon and around Mont St Clair, Sète is situated on the south-eastern end of the Étang de Thau, an enclosed salt water lake used primarily for oyster and mussel fields. To its other side lies the Mediterranean, and the town has a network of canals which are links between the Étang de Thau and the Mediterranean Sea.

Climate
Sète has a mediterranean climate (Köppen climate classification Csa).

History

The name first appeared in Ptolemy (Geography II.10.2.): Σήτιον ὄρος, later in Avienius' (Ora Maritima): Setius... mons and on the maps of Aniane: fiscum..qui nuncupatur Sita

During the 11th century Catharism appeared in the Languedoc region.

1600–1900
On 29 July 1666, the first stone was officially set on the Saint-Louis pier.
In 1681 the Canal du Midi was completed.
In 1684, Vauban visited the port.
In 1703, Saint-Louis church was consecrated.
From 24 to 26 July 1710, during the War of the Spanish Succession the British attacked Sète, soon fought back by the Adrien Maurice de Noailles Duke of Noailles.
In 1710–1711, Saint-Pierre and Butte-Ronde forts were built.
In 1724, the townhouse was bought.
In 1744, the Richelieu citadel and the Castellas tower were built.

19th century
Between 1807–1809 the British tried to burn the town. On 21 May 1821, the first stone of the breakwater was set (finished in 1869). On 9 June 1839  the Montpellier-Sète railway was opened. On 6 May 1872 the chamber of commerce was established. Between 1882–1888 construction works on the port took place. On 24 June 1894 Sante Geronimo Caserio, an Italian anarchist from Lombardy and apprentice baker in Sète stabbed to death president Sadi Carnot in Lyon. In 1895, the boys' high school, later renamed the Lycée Paul Valéry was opened.

20th century
In 1901 an electric tramway network was built (used until 1935). In 1902, the Nelson family opened Chateau Nelson. On 20 January 1928, the name of the town changed from Cette to Sète. In 1934, FC Sète 34 won the Ligue 1 and Coupe de France and became the first football club to win both the same year. On 23 May 1939: the SS Sinaia leaves the port with Spanish Republicans seeking asylum in Lázaro Cárdenas's Mexico. On 12 November 1942: the town is occupied by the German troops of the Wehrmacht. On 25 June 1944 Sète railway station, Balaruc-les-Bains's and Frontignan's oil refineries were bombarded by the American 15th Air Force. On 20 August 1944 Sète was liberated. On 11 July 1947, the packet steamship SS President Warfield leaves for Palestine with 4 530 Jews who survived the Shoah. The port official M. Leboutet had authorised captain Ike Aronowicz to sail to Colombia and, after 5 days on the Atlantic Ocean, the ship took the name SS Exodus and changed direction towards Palestine.  from the coast, they were stopped by 5 British torpedo boats. 75 passengers accepted asylum in France, while the others were brought to Hamburg via Gibraltar. In 1960, the Théâtre de la Mer was built. In 1962, the technical college Joliot-Curie was opened. In 1966–1978 major construction works on the port took place. In 1970, the Museum Paul Valéry was opened. From 1981–1984, a new public hospital was built. On 31 October 1991, the espace Georges Brassens, a museum dedicated to the singer, opened.

21st century
In 2004, a plan to preserve the Lido and prevent further coastal damage was made. In 2005 a new neighbourhood called Villeroy was created. In 2006 the "espace Georges Brassens" was renovated. In January 2007, the Languedoc-Roussillon manages the port of Sète. In 2014, une ville humanitaire, saw the creation of "les Anges de la Rue". In 2016, a great wine spill occurred at the Nelson Château.

Population

Patron saint 
In 1703, when the Saint-Louis church was consecrated, Louis IX, patron of the port, also became the patron saint of the town. He has been celebrated every year on 25 August, with canal jousting competitions, music and fireworks, except during wartime.

Transport

Sète is the eastern starting point of the Canal du Midi, and the ending point of the Canal du Rhône à Sète. Its train station Gare de Sète is approximately 15 minutes by train from Montpellier, and is also served by long-distance trains to Bordeaux, Toulouse, Marseille and Paris. Car ferries sail between Sète and Morocco.

Culture 
Sète is a centre of water jousting, and hosts a major tournament during the town festival, the St-Louis.

Paul Valéry's poem Le Cimetière Marin, depicts the graveyard above Sète's harbour.  Valéry is buried in the graveyard, and the nearby Paul Valéry Museum contains a collection of his drawings and manuscripts.

Espace Georges-Brassens is a museum dedicated to the Sétois singer-songwriter.

Agnès Varda's first film, La Pointe Courte, was filmed in the environs of Sète.

Director Abdellatif Kechiche set his film 2007 The Secret of the Grain, Mektoub, My Love: Canto Uno (2017) and Mektoub, My Love: Intermezzo (2019) in Sète.

De vrais mensonges (Beautiful Lies) is a 2010 French comedy-romance film, set in the town, starring Audrey Tautou and directed by Pierre Salvadori.

Notable people

Sète was the birthplace of:

 David Serene (born 1970), footballer and veterinarian
 Paul Valéry (1871–1945), author and poet of the Symbolist school
 Paul-Marie Masson (1882–1954), composer and musicologist
 Jean Vilar (1912–1971), actor and creator of the Avignon theatre festival
 Georges Brassens (1921–1981), singer and songwriter
 Manitas de Plata (1921–2014), flamenco guitarist
 Gilbert Py (born 1933), Opera tenor
 Ives Roqueta (born 1933), writer and occitan activist
 Alain de Pouzilhac (born 1945), CEO of France 24 and former president of France Médias Monde
 Simon Sutour (born 1952), Senator of the department Gard
 Robert Combas (born 1957), sculptor and painter
 Hervé Di Rosa (born 1959), painter and sculptor
 David Darmon (born 1975), footballer
 Mathieu Peisson (born 1982), water polo player and Olympian at the 2016 Summer Olympics
 Frédéric Sessa (born 1985), free-diver
 Fidji Simo (born 1985), managing director Instacart

International relations

Sète is twinned with:
 Neuburg an der Donau, Germany, since 1986
 El Jadida, Morocco, since 1992
 Cetara, Italy, since 2003

Gallery

See also
Communes of the Hérault department

References

External links

 City council website 

Communes of Hérault
Seaside resorts in France
Languedoc